Elke Gebhardt (born 22 July 1983) is a German former racing cyclist. She competed in the 2013 UCI women's road race in Florence.

See also
2009 DSB Bank-LTO season
2013 Team Argos-Shimano season

References

External links
 

1983 births
Living people
German female cyclists
Sportspeople from Freiburg im Breisgau
Cyclists from Baden-Württemberg